The 2015–16 FC Krasnodar season was the 5th successive season that the club played in the Russian Premier League, the highest tier of association football in Russia. Krasnodar also took part in the Russian Cup and the Europa League, entering at the Third qualifying round.

Squad

Out on loan

Reserve squad

Transfers

Summer

In:

Out:

Winter

In:

Out:

Competitions

Russian Premier League

Results by round

Matches

League table

Russian Cup

UEFA Europa League

Qualifying rounds

Group stage

Knockout phase

Squad statistics

Appearances and goals

|-
|colspan="14"|Players away from the club on loan:

|-
|colspan="14"|Players who left Krasnodar during the season:
|}

Goal Scorers

Disciplinary record

References

FC Krasnodar seasons
Krasnodar
Krasnodar